Herbert J. Buehler (April 10, 1927 – June 24, 2007) was an American politician who served in the New Jersey Senate from the 10th Legislative District from 1974 to 1978.

References

1927 births
2007 deaths
Democratic Party New Jersey state senators
People from Bayonne, New Jersey
20th-century American politicians